Riverview is a town in Albert County, New Brunswick, Canada. Riverview is located on the south side of the Petitcodiac River, across from the larger cities of Moncton and Dieppe. Riverview's slogan is "A Great Place To Grow". With a population of 19,667 in 2016, Riverview is the fifth largest municipality in New Brunswick, having a larger population than the cities of Edmundston, Bathurst, Campbellton, and Miramichi, despite its designation of "town".

History

Though the Petitcodiac River was a regular transportation corridor for aboriginal peoples, the first known settlements in the area were three Acadian villages in what are now Turtle Creek, Lower Coverdale and Point Park. The French-speaking families were forced to abandon the area in 1758 during the Grand Derangement. Resettlement of what would become Riverview began around 1783 when settlers from Yorkshire, England began to farm there. The Town of Riverview was formed on July 9, 1973 with the amalgamation of the three villages of Bridgedale, Gunningsville and Riverview Heights. Harold Findlay became the first mayor and seven councillors were elected at-large to serve a population of 14,177. Since that time, Riverview has grown to include almost 19,130 represented by four ward councillors and three councillors-at-large.

Demographics

Riverview's linguistic majority is English, with 90.6% speaking English as a first language and only 7.8% speaking French as a first language. The adjacent cities of Moncton and Dieppe are about 32% and 73% Francophone respectively and have benefited from an ongoing rural depopulation of the Acadian Peninsula and areas in northern and eastern New Brunswick.  About 27% of the town population is bilingual and understands both English and French.

Neighbourhoods
Riverview has six main neighbourhoods, each with several smaller subdivisions:
West Riverview
Riverview Heights
 Findlay South
Gunningsville
Point Park
 Bridgedale

Emergency services
The town is served by Ambulance New Brunswick, Riverview Fire & Rescue, and the Royal Canadian Mounted Police.  Hospital services are located in Moncton, New Brunswick.

Sports

Facilities
See Moncton Sport Facilities
 Riverview Aquatic Centre - a full size indoor swimming pool with 6 lanes (each 25m long) connected with Riverview High School.
 Several soccer and baseball fields
 Byron Dobson Memorial Arena, with two hockey rinks
 Six green clay tennis courts
 Parklanes Bowling Centre - 12 candlepin bowling lanes with automatic scoring

Events

Riverview Sunfest is an annual festival of events to celebrate the incorporation of Riverview as a town and Canada Day.

Urban parks
Caseley Park - A large park in front of town hall named after former mayor of Riverview, Ralph Caseley. The park includes a monument of a Centurion Tank and a monument to the victims of the Polytechnique massacre.
Riverfront Park - A park by the Petitcodiac River Causeway featuring an outdoor workout centre often referred to as the "Green Gym". 
Mill Creek Nature Park - a 133 ha nature park with a network of formal and informal trails.
Bridgedale Centre Play Area
Dobson Trail
Gunningsville Boulevard
Hawthorne Play Area
Riverview Lions Community Park

Places of interest

The town is home to one of seven Nav Canada area control centres, Moncton Area Control Centre, serving air traffic over New Brunswick, Prince Edward Island, Nova Scotia and eastern Quebec. The centre controls all air traffic between Europe and Eastern Canada. This centre monitors over 430,000 flights a year, 80% of which are either entering or leaving North American airspace.

Media
See Media in Greater Moncton

Transportation
See Greater Moncton Transportation

Education

There are currently seven schools in Riverview, including one high school, one middle school, and five elementary schools. In December 2011, it was officially announced that a new K-8 school would be constructed in East Riverview that is expected to open for the 2013 school year.

Riverview High School (9-12)
Riverview Middle School (6-8)
Riverview East School (K-8)
West Riverview School|West Riverview Elementary School (K-5)
Frank L. Bowser Elementary School (K-5)
Claude D. Taylor Elementary School (K-5)

Climate

Notable people

See also
Greater Moncton
Media in Moncton
List of events in Riverview
List of events in Greater Moncton
List of communities in New Brunswick

References

Further reading
A History of the Town, Riverview: Amalgamating Bridgedale, Gunningsville, Riverview Heights, Hantsport: Lancelot Press, 1986.

External links
 

 
Towns in New Brunswick